Below is a list of squads used in the 1994 African Cup of Nations.

Group A

Mali 
Coach: Mamadou Keïta

Tunisia 
Coach: Youssef Zouaoui, Faouzi Benzarti

Zaire 
Coach: Kalala Mukendi

Group B

Egypt 
Coach: Taha Ismail

Gabon 
Coach:   Jean Thissen

Nigeria 
Coach:  Clemens Westerhof

Group C

Ivory Coast 
Coach:   Henryk Kasperczak

Sierra Leone 
Coach:  Raymond Zarpanelian

Zambia 
Coach:   Ian Porterfield

Group D

Ghana 
Coach: Edward Aggrey-Fynn

Guinea 
Coach: Naby Camara

Senegal 
Coach: Jules Bocandé and Saar Boubacar

References 
 (RSSSF)

Africa Cup of Nations squads